This is a discography for South African accordionist and composer Nico Carstens.

Albums

Label

Brigadiers
 1988, Brigadiers BRIGL 2021, Met Permissie (Music from the TV Series)

Capitol of the World Series
 1957 Capitol of the World Series T10075 (USA Release), Boeremusiek

Columbia
 19??  Columbia SSA 218, Fanagalo (First plastic non-breakable 45 single in South Africa), Peterson Brothers with Nico Carstens
 19??  Columbia 33JS 11002, Ons Eie Volksliedjies (South African Folk Tunes), Nico Carstens and his Orchestra
 19??  Columbia 33JSX 11002, Folk Songs, Nico Carstens en his Orchestra
 19??  Columbia 33JS 11003, Koffiehuiskonsert, Nico Carstens and his Orchestra
 19??  Columbia 33JSX 11003, My Hartedief, Nico Carstens en his Orchestra with Jurie Ferreira
 19??  Columbia 33JS 11004, Braaivleisaand, Nico Carstens and his Orchestra
 19??  Columbia 33JSX 11004, Liefdesgeluk, Nico Carstens en his Orchestra with Jurie Ferreira
 19??  Columbia 33JS 11005, Nuwe Klanke in Konsertina Musiek, Nico Carstens and his Orchestra
 19??  Columbia 33JS 11006, Sunny South Africa, Nico Carstens and his Orchestra
 19??  Columbia 33JSX 11006, Sing Along With Me, Nico Carstens
 1959 Columbia 33JS 11007, Flying High, Cherry Wainer & Nico Carstens
 19??  Columbia 33JSX 11007, Lekker Dans, Nico Carstens
 19??  Columbia 33JS 11008, Dis Opskud, Nico Carstens and his Boere Orkes
 19??  Columbia 33JSX 11008, Ek Hoor 'n Melodie, Nico Carstens
 19??  Columbia 33JS 11009, Lief en Leed, Nico Carstens and his Orchestra
 19??  Columbia 33JSX 11009, Al die Veld is Vrolik, Nico Carstens en his Orchestra with Jurie Ferreira
 19??  Columbia 33JS 11010, Tiekiedraai, Nico Carstens and his Orchestra with Rassie Erasmus and his Concertina
 19??  Columbia 33JS 11011, On Safari, Nico Carstens with the Peterson Brothers
 19??  Columbia 33JSX 11011, 40 Favourites, Nico Carstens and his Orchestra
 19??  Columbia 33JS 11012, Rassie en Nico, Nico Carstens and Rassie Erasmus on Concertina
 19??  Columbia 33JSX 11014 (Reissue by EMI), Under an African Sky, Nico Carstens his Orchestra and Chorus
 1950 Columbia DE 315 (78 RPM Shellac), Oom Hans se Gemmerdans, Nico Carstens with Rassie Erasmus on Consertina
 1954  Columbia 33JS 11001, Wisseldans, Nico Carstens and his Orchestra
 1958  Columbia 33JS 11001X, Wisseldans Nr 2, Nico Carstens and his Orchestra      
 1959 Columbia 33JSX 11015 (Reissued as MFP SRSJ 7005), Goue Plaat, Nico Carstens and his Orchestra
 1959 Columbia 33JS 11016, Boere Wisseldans, Nico Carstens and his Orchestra
 1959 Columbia 33JSX 11016, Beste Wense, Nico Carstens with Dulcie Debbo and Jurie Ferreira
 1961 Columbia 33JSX 11021, Goue Treffers, Nico Carstens and his Orchestra
 1961 Columbia 33JSX 11022, Nico en Neels, Nico Carstens and Neels Steyn
 1962 Columbia 33JSX 11028, Nico en Frikkie, Nico Carstens and Frikkie van Staten
 1962 Columbia 33JSX 11030, Goue Vingers, Nico Carstens and his Orchestra
 1962 Columbia 33JSX 11031, In die Blouberge, Nico Carstens and Neels Steyn
 1962 Columbia 33JSX 11034 (Reissued as Hit City HC(A) 609 in 1986), Nico se Dansparty, Nico Carstens and his Orchestra
 1962 Columbia 33JSX 11038, Springbokland, Nico Carstens and his Orchestra
 1963 Columbia 33JSX 11044, Knoppies en Klawers, Nico Carstens and Frikkie van Staten
 1963 Columbia 33JSX 11046, Op Toer, Nico Carstens and his Orchestra
 1963 Columbia 33JSX 11050, Dis Totsiens nie Vaarwel, Nico Carstens and his Orchestra
 1963 Columbia 33JSX 11052, Die Oue en die Nuwe, Nico Carstens and Neels Steyn
 1964 Columbia 33JSX 11055, Country Holiday, Nico Carstens and his Orchestra
 1964 Columbia 33JSX 11057, Saturday Night Party, Nico Carstens and his Orchestra
 1964 Columbia 33JSX 11059, Die Wonderwêreld van Kammie Kamfer, Al Debbo with Nico Carstens
 1964 Columbia 33JSX 11060, Dance with Nico and Zona, Nico Carstens with Zona Visser
 1965 Columbia 33JSX 11063 (Reissued as MFP SRJS 7008), Net die Beste, Nico Carstens and his Orchestra with Jurie Ferreira
 1965 Columbia 33JSX 11066, 20 Goue Jare, Nico Carstens and his Orchestra
 1965 Columbia 33JSX 11067, Boeresport, Nico Carstens and his Orchestra
 1965 Columbia 33JSX 11069, Kom Dans met Nico, Nico Carstens and his Orchestra
 1966 Columbia 33JSX 11073, Dis Feestyd, Nico Carstens and his Orchestra
 1966 Columbia 33JSX 11075, Kalahari Kaskenades, Nico Carstens and his Orchestra with Corrie Rossouw and his Concertina
 1966 Columbia 33JSX 11076, Laat ons Dans, Nico Carstens and his Orchestra
 1966 Columbia 33JSX 11079, Nico en Adam, Nico Carstens and his Orchestra with Adam Grobler
 1966 Columbia JSX 11082, Akkordeon Skoffel, Nico Carstens and his Orchestra
 1967 Columbia JSX 11087, Lekker Dans, Nico Carstens and his Orchestra
 1967 Columbia JSX 11088, Nog 'n Nico en Adam Treffer, Nico Carstens and his Orchestra with Adam Grobler
 1967 Columbia JSX 11089, Opskud!, Nico Carstens and his Orchestra with Peter Wolmerans
 1967 Columbia JSX 11091, Nog 'n Dansie, Nico Carstens and his Orchestra
 1967 Columbia JSX 11092, Emma Kolemma, Nico Carstens and his Orchestra
 1967 Columbia JSX 11093, Goue Klawers, Nico Carstens and his Orchestra
 1967 Columbia JSX 11094, Dans tot Hoenderkraai, Nico Carstens and his Orchestra with Theuns Botes on Concertina
 1967 Columbia JSX 11104, Party Time-Tyd, Nico Carstens and his Orchestra
 1968 Columbia JSX 11117, Parade, Nico Carstens and his Orchestra
 1968 Columbia JSX 11124 (Reissued by MFP), Baas Jack, Al Debbo with Nico Carstens and his Orchestra
 1968 Columbia JSX 11125, Africa Go Go, Nico Carstens and his Orchestra
 1968 Columbia JSX 11135, Sonbrilletjies, Al Debbo with Nico Carstens and his Orchestra
 1969 Columbia JSX 11138, Net die Beste Vol 2, Jurie Ferreira with Nico Carstens
 1969 Columbia JSX 11142, Die Beste van Al en Nico, Al Debbo with Nico Carstens and his Orchestra
 1969 Columbia JSX(D) 11143, Die Beste van Nico Carstens, Nico Carstens and his Orchestra
 1969 Columbia SCXJ 11145, Sounds Alright, Nico Carstens and his Orchestra with the Hennie Bekker Sound
 1969 Columbia SCXJ 11147 (Reissued under MFP label), Danie Bosman – Liedjies en Wysies, Nico Carstens with Charles Doubell
 1969 Columbia SCXJ(D)11157, Stadig Oor die Klippe, Al Debbo with Nico Carstens and his Orchestra
 1969 Columbia SCXJ 11165, Nico se Boeredans, Nico Carstens with Adam Grobler
 1969 Columbia SCXJ(D)11170, Die Beste van Nico Carstens Vol 2, Nico Carstens
 1970 Columbia SCXJ 11180, Die Tantes van Nantes, Al Debbo with Nico Carstens
 1970 Columbia SCJX 11183, SA '70, Nico Carstens and his Orchestra
 1970 Columbia SCXJ 11188, Boere Brass, Nico Carstensfeaturing Robin Netcher
 1970 Columbia SCXJ 11191, Vat Hom Dawie!, Adam Grobler with Nico Carstens

EMI
 19??  EMI, Springbokke Bo!, Nico Carstens
 1971 EMI, Party '’71, Nico Carstens
 19??  EMI Uitspan RLF 1055, Konsertina Jol, Nico Carstens with Frikkie van Staten

His Master's Voice
 19??  His Master's Voice, Die Skatkis van Afrikaanse Musiek (Compilation – First Afrikaans 10" record), Al Debbo with Nico Carstens

MFP
 19??  MFP, Saterdagaand Party / Saturday Night Party, Nico Carstens
 1983 MFP 57038, Carstens Cabernet, Nico Carstens
 19??  MFP 58094, 20 Van die Beste, Nico Carstens
 1971 MFP SRSJ 7042 (Reissued on EMI), Goue Plaat Vol 2, Nico Carstens
 19??  MFP SRSJ 7081, Nico Carstens Se Goue Sterre, Nico Carstens
 1976 MFP SRSJ 7091, By die Koffiehuis, Nico Carstens
 1978 MFP SRSJ 8067, Dans! Dans! Dans!, Nico Carstens
 1978 MFP SRSJ 8070, Nic en Nico, Nic Potgieter and Nico Carstens
 1978 MFP SRSJ 8089, Zulu Warrior, Al Debbo with Nico Carstens
 19??  MFP / Uitspan RLF 1040, So Dans die Boere, Nico Carstens with Frikkie van Staten

Nebula Bos records
 2000 Boereqanga – Made in South Africa, Nico Carstens and Dave Ledbetter

Unknown Label
 19??  25 Grootste Treffers, Nico Carstens
 19??  Die Kalfie Wals, Adam Grobler with Nico Carstens
 19??  Kwela Carstens, Nico Carstens
 19??  Oliekolonie, Nico Carstens
 19??  Sounds Lekker, Nico Carstens with Dimpel Pretorius

Cross Reference of Songs Performed by Nico Carstens

Medley Cross Reference

References

Discographies of South African artists
South African composers
South African musicians
South African accordionists